Sheyna is a rural locality (a village) in Plesetsky District, Arkhangelsk Oblast, Russia. The population was 1 as of 2010.

Geography 
Sheyna is located 72 km southwest of Plesetsk (the district's administrative centre) by road. Kuvakino is the nearest rural locality.

References 

Rural localities in Plesetsky District